Hopea griffithii is a tree in the family Dipterocarpaceae.  It is named for the British doctor and naturalist William Griffith.

Description
The bark is smooth.

Distribution and habitat
Hopea griffithii is native to southern Myanmar, southern Thailand, Peninsular Malaysia, Singapore and Borneo.

Conservation
Hopea griffithii has been assessed as endangered on the IUCN Red List. It is threatened by land conversion for agriculture and by logging for its timber. The species is found in some protected areas, particularly in Sarawak.

References

griffithii
Flora of Borneo
Flora of Malaya
Flora of Myanmar
Flora of Thailand
Plants described in 1873